Alfred Thomas (born 4 August 1949) is a former Guyanese boxer. He competed in the men's middleweight event at the 1980 Summer Olympics. At the 1980 Summer Olympics, he lost to Valentin Silaghi of Romania. Thomas won a bronze medal in the middleweight class at the 1979 Pan American Games.

References

1949 births
Living people
Middleweight boxers
Guyanese male boxers
Olympic boxers of Guyana
Boxers at the 1980 Summer Olympics
Boxers at the 1979 Pan American Games
Boxers at the 1983 Pan American Games
Pan American Games bronze medalists for Guyana
Pan American Games medalists in boxing
Place of birth missing (living people)
Medalists at the 1979 Pan American Games